Baylor Romney is a former American football quarterback. He played college football for the BYU Cougars.

High school career
Romney grew up in a Latter-day Saint colony in Mexico, but moved to El Paso, Texas prior to his freshman year of high school. Romney graduated from Franklin High School in 2015.

Recruiting
Romney originally committed to Nevada on August 11, 2014, and signed with the team on February 4, 2015. However, after going on an LDS mission to Carlsbad, California, he enrolled at Brigham Young University.

College career
Romney redshirted in 2018 before playing in four games in 2019, starting two of them against Boise State and Liberty. He threw for 747 yards and 7 touchdowns. He had two interceptions. He played in seven games in 2020, throwing a touchdown pass and an interception.

Retirement
Baylor Romney announced at the end of 2021 that he would move on from BYU and enter the transfer portal.

After six weeks in the transfer portal, he announced he would step away from football.

Statistics

Personal life
His wife, Elise, competes in pole vault for the BYU track and field team. His brother, Gunner, is a wide receiver for the Cougars. He has two other siblings and his parents are named Jeni and Cade.

He is a distant relative of Senator Mitt Romney.

References

External links
 BYU Cougars bio

Living people
BYU Cougars football players
Players of American football from El Paso, Texas
American football quarterbacks
Year of birth missing (living people)